William Tudor (January 28, 1779March 9, 1830) was American businessman, journalist, and author from Boston who was co-founder of the North American Review and the Boston Athenæum. It was Tudor who christened Boston "The Athens of America" in an 1819 letter. His brother Frederic Tudor founded the Tudor Ice Company and became Boston's "Ice King", shipping ice to the tropics from many local sources of fresh water including Walden Pond, Fresh Pond, and Spy Pond in Arlington, Massachusetts.

Life 

Tudor was the oldest child of William Tudor and Delia Jarvis Tudor. He graduated from Phillips Academy, Andover and received a Bachelor of Arts degree from Harvard College in 1796. Tudor's travels to Europe polished his civility, and it is said that he held George III's interest in conversation long enough to bring complaints from the lord in waiting, who had others to present. Tudor wrote home to his mother from Paris in 1799, at age 20, that he was sending:

One of his visitors in 1782, the young Marquis de Chastellux, has left a record; he was delighted to find that Mrs. Tudor had arranged a program of French songs, to be sung by a young nephew of the admiral to the accompaniment of his harp. "I thought myself in heaven, or which is the same thing, I thought myself returned to my country."

Tudor was a member of the Massachusetts Historical Society and served as United States Consul in Peru from March 27, 1824 until May 15, 1827, and as Chargé d'Affaires at Rio de Janeiro from his appointment on June 26, 1827 until his death by fever there on March 9, 1830. His tomb was rediscovered by Charles Lyon Chandler in 1944.

Tudor and the Granite Railway 

Tudor was indirectly involved in the Granite Railway. This was the first railroad in the United States, created to carry granite for the construction of the Bunker Hill Monument. George Ticknor, a well-known lawyer and antiquarian, first suggested the memorial and an interested group of men met for breakfast at the home of Colonel Thomas Handasyd Perkins. Among them were Tudor, Daniel Webster, Professor George Ticknor, Doctor John C. Warren, William Sullivan, and George Blake. On May 10, 1823, the first public meeting was called. Work proceeded somewhat slowly, but on January 4, 1826, citizens petitioned the Massachusetts legislature to build a railroad, which was then completed in short order and became operational on October 9, 1826 as the first railroad in the United States.

Literary accomplishments 

Tudor was co-founder and first editor of the famous North American Review, and cofounder of the Monthly Anthology, founded by Phineas Adams and then published from 1803-1811 as the vehicle of the Anthology Club whose members included Tudor, George Ticknor, Dr. Bigelow and Rev. J. S. J. Gardiner, Alexander H. Everett, and Rev. Messrs. Buckminster, Thacher, and the Rev. William Emerson (father of Ralph Waldo Emerson).

His chief literary works were the Miscellanies (1821), a collection of essays written for the Monthly Anthology and the North American Review, on subjects ranging from the "Secret Causes of the American and French Revolutions" to human misery, purring cats, and cranberry sauce; The Life of James Otis of Massachusetts (1823), generally considered Tudor's best work; and Gebel Teir (1829), an anonymous satire on international politics in which a council of birds, representing the United States, Spain, England, France, and the Elysian Fields, gathers to discuss politics.

Selected works 
 1800  Letter on the Propriety of an Appropriate National Name. Mass. Hist. Soc. Collections, vol. 7, 1800.
 1806  Considerations on the Expediency of a Bridge from one Part of Boston to another. Boston. [Anon.]
 1809  An Oration July 4, 1809, at the Request of the Selectmen of Boston. Boston.
 1817  Discourse before the Humane Society at their Anniversary, May, 1817. Boston.
 1821  Letters on the Eastern States. 1820; Boston. [Anon.]
 1821  Miscellanies. Boston.
 1823  Life of James Otis, of Massachusetts. Boston.
 1829  Gebel Teir. Boston. [Anon.]
 1837  Correspondence while chargé d'affaires to Brazil. Washington. (28th cong., 1st ses., House Docs., no. 32).
 1841  Character of Samuel Adams. Boston Book Col.
 2005 "A Call to the Sea: Captain Charles Stewart of the USS Constitution". Washington

References 
Notes

Sources
 

1779 births
1830 deaths
American diplomats
People from Boston
Harvard College alumni
Phillips Academy alumni
19th-century American diplomats
Ice trade